Paddy Kirwan is a retired Irish sportsperson.  He played hurling with his local club Ballyskenagh and was a member of the Offaly senior inter-county team from 1979 until 1984.  Kirwan was a member of the Offaly team that won their first All-Ireland title in 1981.

Since retiring from the game, Kirwan has trained club teams, and has run a taxi service.

He served as a selector for Offaly for 2006-07.

References

External links
  https://web.archive.org/web/20101210035629/http://www.offalyexpress.ie/sport/Take-two-for-Drumcullen.6644669.jp

Living people
Ballyskenagh hurlers
Offaly inter-county hurlers
All-Ireland Senior Hurling Championship winners
Year of birth missing (living people)